The Court of Claims can refer to:

 New York Court of Claims
 Ohio Court of Claims
 Court of Claims (United Kingdom)
 Court of Claims (Ireland), a body established by the Act of Settlement 1662
 United States Court of Claims, a federal court which existed from 1855 to 1982
 United States Court of Federal Claims, an existing federal court established in 1982